Sedina buettneri, or Blair's wainscot, is a moth of the family Noctuidae. The species was first described by Eduard von Hering in 1858. It is found in the Palearctic realm. Outside of Europe, it is occasionally found in temperate Asia, the coast of the Black Sea, the base of the Caucasus mountains, the Caspian Sea, Iran, Russia east to the Urals, Lake Baikal and Altai regions, and in Japan and the Kuril Islands.

Technical description and variation

Forewing straw-colour, the veins rufous, the intervals with grey streaks; hindwing grey, with rufous veins. The wingspan is 20–35 mm.

Biology
The moth flies from August to October in one generation depending on the location.

The larvae feed on Carex acutiformis and Glyceria species.

References

External links

Fauna Europaea
Lepiforum e.V.
Schmetterlinge-Deutschlands.de

Hadeninae
Moths described in 1858
Moths of Europe
Moths of Japan
Moths of Asia